This is a list of lakes in Vermont.

The Vermont Department of Health and Department of Environmental Conservation establish the limits of Escherichia coli allowed before swimming is permitted. The E. coli is not checked for type, some of which are not harmful to humans. They allow up to 235 colonies per  of water sampled.

 Arrowhead Mountain Lake
 Ball Mountain Lake
 Lake Bomoseen
 Lake Carmi
 Caspian Lake
 Cedar Lake
 Lake Champlain (extends into Quebec; largest lake  New England)
 Comerford Reservoir
 Crystal Lake
 Lake Dunmore
 Echo Lake
 Lake Elmore
 Lake Fairlee
 Griffith Lake
 Lake Groton
 Harriman Reservoir
 Harvey's Lake
 Lake Iroquois
 Island Pond
 McIndoes Reservoir
 Lake Memphremagog (extends into Quebec)
 Maidstone Lake
 Moore Reservoir
 Lake Morey
 North Hartland Lake
 North Springfield Lake
 Lake Parker
 Lake Rescue
 Lake Saint Catherine
 Lake Salem
 Lake Seymour
 Silver Lake
 Ticklenaked Pond
 Townshend Lake
 Wallace Pond
 Lake Willoughby
 Lake Winona

References

Lakes
Vermont